Adrienne Edwards is a New York-based art curator, scholar, and writer. Edwards is currently the Engell Speyer Family Curator and Curator of Performance at the Whitney Museum of American Art.

Career

Curating 
Edwards curated performance commissions at Performa from 2010 to 2018. Prior to moving to the Whitney in 2018, Edwards worked as curator at large at the Walker Art Center in Minneapolis. She held that position since 2016. As of 2018 Edwards, was a Performance Studies Ph.D. student at N.Y.U. In 2016, Edwards curated a show Blackness in Abstraction, at Pace Gallery. 

In 2019, Edwards with Danielle A. Jackson curated an exhibition at the Whitney: Jason Moran, the first museum survey devoted to the MacArthur-winning pianist and conceptualist.

Whitney Biennial 2022 

In October 2019, the Whitney Museum announced that Adrienne Edwards and David Breslin would curate the 2022 Whitney Biennial. She is the official co-curator alongside David Breslin for Quiet as It’s Kept, the eighteenth iteration of the landmark exhibition. The 2022 Whitney Biennial officially opens to the public on April 6, 2022.

Writing 
Edwards authored the catalog for Blackness in Abstraction, the group exhibition she organized at Pace Gallery; as well as, contributing to the "Carrie Mae Weems: The Kitchen Table Series" and Ellen Gallagher's catalog Accidental Records. Edwards was the performance reviews editor for the journal of feminist theory Women & Performance.

Other activities 
In 2022, Edwards chaired the jury of the Venice Biennale.

References

External links
A Conversation Between Adrienne Edwards and Okwui Okpokwasili, Dedalus Foundation

Living people
American art curators
American women curators
People associated with the Whitney Museum of American Art
Year of birth missing (living people)
Place of birth missing (living people)
21st-century American women